Mahaki Amin Beyg (also Romanized as Mahakī Amīn Beyg; also known as Mahakī Amīn) is a village in Beshiva Pataq Rural District, in the Central District of Sarpol-e Zahab County, Kermanshah Province, Iran. At the 2006 census, its population was 54, in 15 families.

References 

Populated places in Sarpol-e Zahab County